David Wilmot is an Irish stage, screen and television actor.

Career 
Wilmot's theatre credits include Six Characters in Search of an Author at the Abbey Theatre in Dublin, As You Like It with the Druid Theatre Company in Galway and Juno and the Paycock in London's West End. He originated the role of Padraic in The Lieutenant of Inishmore at The Other Place in Stratford-upon-Avon in 2001, played it at the Barbican Centre in 2002, then joined the 2006 off-Broadway Atlantic Theater Company production, which later transferred to Broadway. He was nominated for the 2006 Tony Award for Best Performance by a Leading Actor in a Play, the Drama League Award for Distinguished Performance, and the Outer Critics Circle Award for Outstanding Actor in a Play and won the Lucille Lortel Award for Outstanding Lead Actor and the Theatre World Award for his performance.

Wilmot portrayed Dr. Ed Costello in sixteen episodes of The Clinic on RTÉ. He was nominated for the Irish Film and Television Award for Best Actor in a TV Drama.

Wilmot's screen credits include Michael Collins (1996), I Went Down (1997), The Devil's Own (1997), The Tale of Sweeney Todd (1998), Intermission (2003), Laws of Attraction (2004), King Arthur (2004), Six Shooter (2006), The Guard (2011) and Gold (2014). He was named Best Supporting Actor in Film and nominated Best New Talent for Intermission at the 2003 Irish Film and Television Awards.

In 2009 and 2010, Wilmot appeared in seasons 3 and 4 of the Showtime series The Tudors as rebel captain Sir Ralph Ellerker. In January 2012 he appeared in Sky 1's version of Treasure Island starring Eddie Izzard. He also appeared in the docudrama Saving the Titanic as the ship's Chief Engineer Joseph Bell.

Wilmot played a supporting role in the BBC One drama Ripper Street, as the cantankerous bearded Police Sergeant Donald Atherton. He similarly played police Captain Connor in 2018's TNT production of The Alienist.

He also played the character of Israel Hands in Season 4 of Starz pirate series Black Sails.

Wilmot starred as a series regular as the corporate consultant Clark in the 2021 HBO Max TV series Station Eleven, an adaptation of the novel of the same name.

Filmography

Film

Television

References

External links

Irish male television actors
Irish male film actors
Irish male stage actors
Year of birth missing (living people)
Living people
Theatre World Award winners